Àngel Sabata Figa (born 28 March 1911 in Barcelona; died 24 September 1990 in Barcelona) was a Spanish water polo player who competed in the 1928 Summer Olympics and in the 1948 Summer Olympics. In 1928 he played in the only match for Spain in the water polo tournament. Twenty years later he was part of the Spanish team which finished eighth in the 1948 tournament. He played four matches.

References

Spanish Olympic Committee Biography (Spanish)

1911 births
Olympic water polo players of Spain
Water polo players from Catalonia
Spanish male water polo players
Water polo players at the 1928 Summer Olympics
Water polo players at the 1948 Summer Olympics
1990 deaths